Tarnowiec may refer to:

Tarnowiec, Lower Silesian Voivodeship (south-west Poland)
Tarnowiec, Lesser Poland Voivodeship (south Poland)
Tarnowiec, Subcarpathian Voivodeship (south-east Poland)
Tarnowiec, Nowy Tomyśl County in Greater Poland Voivodeship (west-central Poland)
Tarnowiec, Złotów County in Greater Poland Voivodeship (west-central Poland)
Tarnowiec, Opole Voivodeship (south-west Poland)
Tarnowiec, West Pomeranian Voivodeship (north-west Poland)